Soline  may refer to several places in Croatia:

Soline, Bosiljevo, village in Bosiljevo municipality
Soline, Dobrinj, village in Dobrinj municipality
Soline, Mljet, hamlet in the Mljet municipality on the eponymous island
Soline, Sali, village in Sali municipality on the island of Dugi Otok
Soline, Župa dubrovačka, village in Župa dubrovačka municipality

Soline  may also refer to:

Soline, Secovljske, saltpans in village of Secovlje, Slovenia (known for Piranske Soline)
Piranske Soline brand of gourmet cooking and table salt